Čakov is a municipality and village in České Budějovice District in the South Bohemian Region of the Czech Republic. It has about 300 inhabitants.

Administrative parts
Villages of Čakovec and Holubovská Bašta are administrative parts of Čakov.

History
The first written mention of Čakov is from 1262.

Čakov was a property of different nobility, often sold or impawn. Since the 14th century, it was owned by the wealthy Rosenberg family and managed from their castle in Český Krumlov. The last owner from the Rosenberg family sold Čakov to the Emperor Rudolf II in 1601.

Sights
The parish Church of Saint Leonard is the landmark of Čakov. The Gothic church was first mentioned in 1343. The Baroque rectory dates from the late 18th century.

Notable people
Jaroslav Pouzar (born 1952), ice hockey player

References

Villages in České Budějovice District